Yusri bin Che Lah (born 29 April 1976) is a Malaysian football coach and former footballer, who played as a midfielder. He is currently employed by Malaysia Super League club Perak, as their U-23 team head coach.

Career

Playing
Born in Kangar, Perlis, Yusri played and captained for hometown side Perlis in the Malaysia Super League. He was formerly with Selangor, MPPJ and Perak before retiring when he played for his former club, Perlis. He represented Malaysia from 1999 until 2001. He made his international debut with the Malaysia senior team in the 1999 Dunhill Cup, although it is not a FIFA 'A' international match. In 2000, he scored two goals in a 6–0 win over Myanmar in a friendly match, which were his only international goals. His last appearance was at the 2001 Merdeka Tournament.

Coaching
Yusri started his coaching career as Perlis U21 team head coach in 2014. In 2015, Yusri was appointed to Malaysia FAM League side Perlis first team. In 2016, he signed a contract with Felcra. On 1 July 2017, his contract with Felcra was terminated. In November 2017, Yusri joined Malaysia Super League side Kelantan as an assistant coach under Sathit Bensoh for 2018 Malaysia Super League.

In 2018, Yusri held the head coach role in a caretaker capacity twice: first when Bensoh resigned in February and again when his replacement Fajr Ibrahim also resigned in June. Despite his best efforts, he failed to avoid Kelantan's relegation to Malaysia Premier League that year, after finishing bottom of the table.

Kelantan agreed with Yusri orally to extend his contract for one more year on 20 November, but after Kelantan failed to provide Yusri with an official contract, he signed for Kuala Lumpur FA on 5 December. On 11 March 2019, he resigned because poor results. On 15 April 2019, Yusri was appointed head coach of Kelantan FA. After finishing sixth in the truncated 2020 Malaysia Premier League because of COVID-19 restrictions, Kelantan announced Yusri's contract would not be renewed beyond that season.

Yusri then was appointed as head coach of the FAM-NSC Project team, a team composed of national U-23 players which plays in the Malaysia Premier League. Yusri resigned at the end of 2021 Malaysia Premier League season, with the team finishing last in the league.

After the resignation of Yusri from FAM-MSN Project team, Perak FC appointed him their new head coach for the 2022 Malaysia Premier League season. With the newly relegated team management and financial problems, which saw the team have points deducted by the league for unpaid salaries to team players and staffs, hit by a ban on transfer of players, and a change of team ownership, Yusri managed Perak to go only one better than the previous year, finishing second last above his former team FAM-MSN Project. At the end of the season, Yusri was reassigned to coach Perak's U-23 team in a shakeup of the team coaching staff, which saw Lim Teong Kim replacing Yusri as the Perak main team head coach.

Honours

Player
Selangor
Malaysia Premier 1: 2000
Malaysia FA Cup: 2001
Malaysia Cup: 2002
Malaysia Charity Shield: 2002

Perak
Malaysia Premier 1: 2003

Perlis
Malaysia Cup: 2004
Malaysia Super League: 2005

Manager
Perlis
Malaysia FAM League runner-up: 2015

References

External links
 

1974 births
Living people
Malaysian footballers
Malaysian people of Malay descent
Perlis FA players
Selangor FA players
Perak F.C. players
People from Perlis
Association football midfielders
Malaysia international footballers
Kuala Lumpur City F.C. managers